The province of Aurora has 151 barangays comprising its 8 municipalities.

Barangays

References

Populated places in Aurora (province)
Aurora